This is an overview of the legality of ayahuasca by country. DMT, one of the active ingredients in ayahuasca, is classified as a Schedule I drug under the United Nations 1971 Convention on Psychotropic Substances, meaning that international trade in DMT is supposed to be closely monitored; use of DMT is supposed to be restricted to scientific research and medical use. Natural materials containing DMT, including ayahuasca, are not regulated under the 1971 Psychotropic Convention. The majority of the world's nations classify DMT as a scheduled drug; however, few countries seem to have laws specifically addressing the possession or use of ayahuasca.

References

External links
 Country-by-country map of ayahuasca's legal status on ICEERS.org

Drug control law
Drug policy by country
Entheogens
Ayahuasca
Lists by country
Psychoactive fungi